"Assembly" is a bugle call that signals troops to assemble at a designated place. 

"Assembly" and "Adjutant's Call" are the two bugle calls that make up the "formation" category of bugle call.

Score

References

Military life
Bugle calls